Ga-Kgapane is a township in Mopani District Municipality in the Limpopo province of South Africa. It is the only township in the Bolobedu area. It is also the area where you can find the magistrates court, police station, hospital, post office and some of the biggest retail shops. The main language spoken is KheLobedu.

References

Populated places in the Greater Letaba Local Municipality